The Château de Dietrich is a château in the commune of Reichshoffen, Bas-Rhin, Alsace, France.

It was built in 1770 and was registered as a monument historique in 1940.

References

Châteaux in Bas-Rhin
Monuments historiques of Bas-Rhin